The Midland Great Western Railway (MGWR) B Class 0-6-0 was a class of 4 locomotives built at North British Locomotive Company in 1904.  In 1925 they were allocated Great Southern Railways (GSR) Class 646 / Inchicore Class J2.

The MGWR Class B was an attempt at a more powerful 0-6-0 locomotive than the existing Class L.  Like the Class A 4-4-0 which they shared some components they were weight restricted to the Dublin-Galway on the MGWR.  They were rebuilt 1916/17 with superheating.  On scrapping some of their tenders were givin to Class A locomotives.

References

0-6-0 locomotives
5 ft 3 in gauge locomotives
Railway locomotives introduced in 1904
B
NBL locomotives
Scrapped locomotives
Steam locomotives of Ireland